Our Christmas is the first of two joint albums released in 2008 by Swedish artists Sanna Nielsen, Shirley Clamp & Sonja Aldén released through Lionheart International.  The album was a commercial success peaking at number one on the Swedish Albums Chart and was certified platinum in 10 days in the country.

Background
After performing together on the '2008 Sommer Sommer Sommer' tour, it was announced in October 2008 that the regular Melodifestivalen entrants (Shirley Clamp, Sanna Nielsen, and Sonya Aldén) would team up for a festive album, simply titled 'Our Christmas'.

The album featured just one original recording; the opening track titled 'Another Winter Night' which is described as "a gloriously overblown 'All by Myself'-esque power ballad that laments the bleakness of a Christmas alone".

Track listing
The album was released digitally and physically on November 19, 2008 with 12 tracks.

Reviews
Jon O'Brien from 'All Music' said;  "This 12-track collaborative effort eschews their trademark anthemic schlager-pop sound in favour of a more refined and sophisticated approach that blends stripped-back acoustic production with the trio's unusually understated vocals. Alongside the classic standards and respectful performances of traditional carols "Silent Night," "O Holy Night," and "The First Noel," there are also a few lesser-known seasonal pieces thrown into the mix, including  the inspirational "Light a Candle" and Donny Hathaway's underrated R&B effort "This Christmas." This surprisingly restrained effort will make fans of schlager-pop divas feel like all their Christmases have come at once."

Chart performance
"Our Christmas" debuted at #2, before rising to #1 on December 4, 2008, where it remained for 3 weeks and was certified platinum.

Weekly charts

Year-end charts

Certifications

References

Sanna Nielsen albums
Shirley Clamp albums
Sonja Aldén albums
2008 Christmas albums
Christmas albums by Swedish artists
Schlager Christmas albums